Richard Tousey (May 18, 1908 – April 15, 1997) was an American astronomer. He was a pioneer in the observation of the sun from space and took the first photographs of the sun's ultraviolet spectrum.

Early life and education 
Richard Tousey was born on May 18, 1908, in Somerville, Massachusetts, to Coleman and Adella Hill Tousey. He received a bachelor's degree from Tufts University (1928), then MA (1929) and Ph.D.(1933) in physics from Harvard University. His dissertation related to measuring optical properties of fluorite at 1216 angstroms was completed under Theodore Lyman.

Career and research 
Tousey taught and conducted research at Harvard from 1933 to 1936, then Tufts until 1941. Upon invitation by E.O. Hulburt, Tousey joined the Naval Research Laboratory where his initial work focused on night vision. Using captured V-2 rockets made available for research at White Sands Missile Range, he was able to measure the first ultraviolet (UV) spectrum of the sun.

Personal life 
He married Ruth Lowe in 1932 and together they had one daughter, Joanna. The family shared an interest in music and collected musical instruments. They also collected and researched antique silverware and its makers. Richard was a member of the American Silver Guild.

Tousey died of pneumonia on April 15, 1997, at Prince Georges Hospital Center in Maryland.

Honors 
 Frederic Ives Medal (1960)
 Honorary Doctor of Science from Tufts (1961)
 Henry Draper Medal (1963)
 Eddington Medal (1964)
 Henry Norris Russell Lectureship (1966)

References

External links
 National Academy of Sciences biography

1908 births
1997 deaths
American astronomers
Harvard University alumni
Tufts University alumni
Fellows of the American Physical Society